The Australian national cricket team toured New Zealand in March 1946, playing a single Test match against New Zealand's national team.

The Australians opened the tour with first-class matches against the four Plunket Shield teams, winning all by large margins, three of them by an innings.

The Test, played at the Basin Reserve, Wellington, was the first played between the two countries, and the first Test played after the conclusion of World War II. Australia (captained by Bill Brown), won the match by an innings and 103 runs, having bowled out New Zealand (captained by Walter Hadlee) twice in less than two days.  The two national sides did not again meet in Tests until New Zealand toured during the 1973–74 season.

Background

Teams from the Australian colonies had visited New Zealand as early as the 1877–78 season, when a combined Australian team played several matches against New Zealand teams. These tours persisted well into the early 20th century, with unofficial Test matches between national representative sides occurring during both the 1909–10 and 1913–14 tours. However, no full internationals were played, owing to the Australian Board of Control for International Cricket's perception of New Zealand as a second-class team. Despite this, New Zealand played its first Test series when an English team toured during the 1929–30 season. Australia had not played an official Test series since its 1938 tour of England, with New Zealand's last Test series occurring on its tour of England the previous season.

A Test tour by Australia, planned for February and March 1940, was cancelled after the outbreak of the Second World War. An itinerary of 14 matches – three Tests, four first-class matches against Plunket Shield teams, and seven other matches – had been arranged, and it was expected that Don Bradman would lead a strong team.

Cricket during World War II had been severely limited in both countries, although an Australian Services team, captained by Lindsay Hassett, had played a series of "Victory Tests" during the 1945 English season.

Tour matches

First-class: Auckland v Australians

First-class: Canterbury v Australians

First-class: Otago v Australians

First-class: Wellington v Australians

Test series

Only Test

The status of the match at the time was uncertain, and the game was not recognised as an official Test until March 1948. Instead of the usual baggy greens, the Australians wore caps and blazers marked "ABC" (for "Australian Board of Control"). Both teams included several debutants—of the twenty-two players in the match, thirteen were making their debut. Australia's best batsman and usual captain Don Bradman declined to tour, having suffered from regular bouts of fibrositis. Queensland batsman Bill Brown was selected as captain in his place, although Lindsay Hassett had also been suggested for the position. New Zealand was skippered by Otago batsman Walter Hadlee, with pre-war captain Curly Page having retired. Australia included seven debutants for the Test, many of whom would go on to play large roles for the national side in later tours, including during the 1948 "Invincibles" tour. The match was also Bill O'Reilly's last at Test level.

Teams

References

Bibliography

External links
 Australia in New Zealand, 1945-46 at Cricinfo
 Australia in New Zealand 1945-46 at CricketArchive
 Australia to New Zealand 1945-46 at Test Cricket Tours 
 

1946 in Australian cricket
1946 in New Zealand cricket
New Zealand cricket seasons from 1945–46 to 1969–70
1945-46
International cricket competitions from 1945–46 to 1960